The flathead chub (Platygobio gracilis) is a species of fish in the carp family, Cyprinidae. It is the only member of the monotypic genus Platygobio. It is native to North America, where it is distributed throughout central Canada and the central United States.

Distribution
This fish was first described from the Saskatchewan River in 1836. It is also known from three other major river systems in central North America, the Mackenzie, Missouri-Mississippi, and Rio Grande drainages. Its distribution extends from the Northwest Territories to Texas.

Biology
This is a minnow with an elongated body and a flat, "wedge-shaped" head. It has a pointed snout with a large mouth and barbels. It has sickle-shaped pectoral fins and a forked tail fin with pointed lobes. It has taste buds in its anal and pelvic fins. It has a slightly curving lateral line and large scales. The body of the adult may be brownish, olive, or black in color with a silvery wash across the sides and belly. The adult is generally 9 to 18 centimeters in length but can reach 26 centimeters. The male and female are similar in appearance.

This fish lives in rivers and large tributaries, often in fast-moving, turbid waters. The species may congregate in groups but moves independently rather than schooling. Spawning behaviors are not well known in this species. Feeding behaviors have not been observed often but the fish is thought to be mostly insectivorous.

References

External links
 

Leuciscinae
Monotypic fish genera
Fish of the United States
Fish of Canada
Fish described in 1836